Onam is an annual Indian harvest festival celebrated predominantly by the Hindus of Kerala. A major annual event for Keralites, it is the official festival of the state and includes a spectrum of cultural events.

Onam commemorates Vamana and King Mahabali. According to Hindu legends, Onam is celebrated in Kerala in remembrance of the good governance under the rule of daitya king Mahabali, a mythical king who once ruled Kerala. The legend holds that jealous of Mahabali's popularity and his power, the devas and gods conspired to end his reign. They sent Vamana to earth in the form of a dwarf Brahmin who trampled Mahabali to patala (netherworld). Vamana asked Mahabali for three feet of land as his wish from the generous Mahabali. Since denying  gifts to Brahmin is considered a sacrilege, Mahabali agreed to fulfill Vamana’s wish. In the first two feet Vamana measured the entirety of universe, leaving nowhere to place his third foot. Mahabali offered his own head to place his third feet making the wish complete. However, witnessing Mahabali’s generosity, Vishnu granted the king's sole wish to visit his land and people once every year. This homecoming of Mahabali is celebrated as Onam in Kerala every year

The date of Onam celebration is based on the Panchangam, and falls on the 22nd nakshatra Thiruvonam in the month Chingam of Malayalam calendar, which in Gregorian calendar falls between August–September.

History

The festival probably has ancient origins and it became intricately linked with Hindu legends at some later date.
Literary and epigraphical evidence suggests that Onam has a long religious context and history in Kerala and neighboring parts of South India:
The earliest known reference to the word Onam as a celebration is found in Maturaikkāñci – a Sangam era Tamil poem. It mentions a festival called Onam being celebrated in dedication to Maayon (Vishnu) in Madurai, when games and duels were held in temple premises, oblations were sent to the temples, people wore new clothes and feasted. 
The 9th-century Pathikas and Pallads by Periyazharwar describes Onam celebrations and offerings to Vishnu, mentions feasts and community events.
An 11th-century inscription in the Thrikkakara Temple (Kochi) dedicated to Vamana – an avatar of Vishnu – mentions a series of offerings made by a votary over two days prior and on Thiru Onam.
A 12th-century inscription in the Tiruvalla Temple, one of the largest Hindu temples in Kerala dedicated to Vishnu, mentions Onam and states a donation was made to the temple as the Onam festival offering.
Uddanda Shastri, a southern Indian Sanskrit poet visiting the court of the Zamorin, has written about a festival called śrāvaṇa. It is presumed that this verse is about the festival of Onam as the word Onam (or Thiruvonam) is the Tamil/Malayalam form of the śrāvaṇa nakshatra mentioned in Indian astronomy:
चोकुयन्ते पृथुकततयश्चापतादिन्य उच्चैः सर्वानार्यःपतिभिरनिशम् लम्भयन्त्यर्थकामान्।

बभ्रम्यन्ते सकलपुरुषैर्वल्लभाभ्यः प्रदातुम् चित्रम् वस्त्रम् श्रावणकुतुकम् वर्तते केरळेषु॥

Gangs of lads, playing their bows hoot loudly again and again; All women make their husbands provide wealth and pleasure; All men are wandering hither and thither to present beautiful garments to their women. The festivity of 'Sravana' takes place in Kerala.
 A 16th-century European memoir describes Onam. It mentions among other things that Onam is always celebrated in September, the Malayali people adorn their homes with flowers and daub them over with cow's dung believing its auspicious association with goddess Lakshmi.

According to Kurup, Onam has been historically a Hindu temple-based community festival celebrated over a period of many days.

Significance

Onam is an ancient  Hindu festival of Kerala that celebrates rice harvest. The significance of the festival is in Indian culture, of which two are more common.

Mahabali and Vamana
According to Hindu mythology, Mahabali was the great-great-grandson of a Brahmin sage named Kashyapa, the great-grandson of a demonic dictator, Hiranyakashipu, and the grandson of Vishnu devotee Prahlada. This links the festival to the Puranic story of Prahlada of Holika fame in Hinduism, who was the son of Hiranyakashipu. Prahlada, despite being born to a demonic Asura father who hated Vishnu, rebelled against his father's persecution of people and worshipped Vishnu. Hiranyakashipu tries to kill his son Prahlada, but is slain by Vishnu in his Narasimha avatar, Prahlada is saved.

Prahlada's grandson, Mahabali, came to power by defeating the gods (Devas) and taking over the three worlds. According to Vaishnavism, the defeated Devas approached Vishnu for help in their battle with Mahabali. Vishnu refused to join the gods in violence against Mahabali because Mahabali was a good ruler and his own devotee. Mahabali, after his victory over the gods, declared that he would perform a Yajna (homa sacrifices/rituals) and grant anyone any request during the Yajna. Vishnu took the avatar – his fifth – of a dwarf monk called Vamana and approached Mahabali. The king offered anything to the boy – gold, cows, elephants, villages, food, whatever he wished. The boy said that one must not seek more than one needs, and all he needed was "three paces of land." Mahabali agreed.

Vamana grew to an enormous size and covered everything Mahabali ruled over in just two paces. For the third pace, Mahabali offered his head for Vishnu to step on, an act that Vishnu accepted as evidence of Mahabali's devotion. Vishnu granted him a boon, by which Mahabali could visit again, once every year, the lands and people he previously ruled. This revisit marks the festival of Onam, as a reminder of the virtuous rule and his humility in keeping his promise before Vishnu. The last day of Mahabali's stay is remembered with a nine-course vegetarian Onasadya feast.

The name Thrikkakara is originated from 'Thiru-kaal-kara' meaning 'place of the holy foot'. The main deity at Thrikkakara Temple is Vamana, the smaller temple to the side has Shiva as the deity. Vamana temple is known as 'Vadakkum Devar' and the Shiva temple is known as 'Tekkum Devar'. A number of subsidiary deities have been installed at Thrikkakara Temple. The 1961 census report on Onam festival states :Though the Vamana temple is accepted as the main temple at the elite level, the local people consider the Shiva temple as the more important one. They believe that Shiva was the 'Kuladeivam' (family deity) of Mahabali and that there was no Vamana temple at that time. The palace of Mahabali was situated at the place where the Vamana temple is at present. After the fall of Mahabali, his palace was destroyed and later on Vamana was installed on that spot by the saint Kapila.According to Nanditha Krishna, a simpler form of this legend, one without Mahabali, is found in the Rigveda and the Vedic text Shatapatha Brahmana where a solar deity is described with powers of Vishnu. This story likely grew over time, and is in part allegorical, where Bali is a metaphor for thanksgiving offering after a bounty of rice harvest during monsoon, and Vishnu is the metaphor of the Kerala sun and summer that precedes the Onam. According to Roshen Dalal, the story of Mahabali is important to Onam in Kerala, but similar Mahabali legends are significant in the region of Balia and Bawan in Uttar Pradesh, Bharuch in Gujarat, and Mahabaleshwar in Maharashtra. The story is significant not because Mahabali's rule ended, but it emphasizes the Hindu belief in cyclical nature of events, that no individual, no ruler and nothing lasts forever, except the virtues and self-understanding that overcomes all sorrow.

Parashurama

An alternate tale behind Onam relates to Parashurama, an incarnation of Vishnu who is credited in Hinduism to have created the Western Ghats from the southern tip of Kerala, Karnataka, Goa and up to Maharashtra. According to this legend, Vishnu got upset with the kings and the warrior caste who were constantly at war and were arrogant over others.

Vishnu took the avatar of Parashurama, or "Rama with an axe" and also known as Rama Jamadagyna, in the era of King Kaartavirya. This king persecuted and oppressed the people, the sages and the gods. One day, the king came to the hermitage of Parashurama and his mother Renuka, where while Parashurama was away, the king without permission took away the calf of their cow. When Parashurama returned, he felt the injustice of the king, called him to war, and killed the king and all his oppressive warriors. At the end, he threw the axe, and wherever it fell, the sea retreated, creating the land of Kerala and other coastal western parts of the Indian subcontinent. Another version states that Parashurama brought Namboodiri Brahmins to southwestern parts of India, by creating a mini-Himalaya-like mountain range with his axe. The Onam festival, according to this legend, celebrates Parashurama's creation of Kerala by marking those days as the new year.

The legend and worship of Parashurama is attested in texts and epigraphs dated to about the 2nd century CE.

Cultural festival
Onam is a "popular major Hindu festival in Kerala", states Christine Frost, but one that is also celebrated by other communities with "much zest alongside Hindus". The festival is celebrated in BECs (Basic Ecclesial communities) in Trivandrum with local rituals, according to Latin Catholic Bishop Selvister Ponnumuthan. These traditions, according to Selvister Ponnumuthan, start with the lighting of Nilavilakku, an arati that includes waving of flowers (pushparati) over the Bible, eating the Onam meal together with the Hindus as a form of "communion of brothers and sisters of different faiths". The significance of these practices are viewed by BECs in Trivandrum as a form of integration with Hindus, mutual respect and sharing a tradition.

Paulinus of St. Bartholomew (1748-1806), in his 'A voyage to the East Indies' describes Onam as :The fourth grand festival, celebrated in Malayala, is called Onam, and happens always in the month of September, on the day of new moon (not always). About the 10th of September the rain ceases in Malabar. All nature seems as if regenerated; the flowers again shoot up, and the trees bloom, in a word, this season is the same as that which Europeans call spring. This festival seems, therefore, to have been instituted for the purpose of soliciting from the Gods a happy and fruitful year. It continues eight days and during that time the Indians are accustomed to adorn their houses with flowers and daub them over with cow's dung; because the cow, as already observed, is a sacred animal dedicated to the Goddess Lakshmi, the Ceres of the Indians. On this occasion they also put on new clothes throw aside all their old earthenware and supply its place by new. The men, particularly those who are young, form themselves into two parties and shoot at each other with arrows. These arrows are blunted, but exceedingly strong, and are discharged with such force, that a considerable number are generally wounded on both sides. These games have a great likeness to the Cerealia and Juvenalia of the ancient Greeks and Romans.

According to P.S. Salini, a research scholar in Islamic studies, most Muslims join the festivities with their friends and celebrate "Hindu festivals such as Onam". According to a 2001 chapter by Filippo Osella and Caroline Osella, both Hindus and non-Hindus have celebrated Onam equally "as a time when the unity of the family and kin group is particularly emphasized". In another 2008 paper, Osella and Osella state that "Onam is not celebrated by Muslims" and the Muslims who do prepare an Onam feast have an air of a "daring secret".

Muslim reformists have called on other Muslims to refrain from taking part in the festival. For example, a Kerala-based Salafi preacher has called Onam as haram (wrong and forbidden). In 2019, another Muslim religious speaker caused controversy over his statement that Muslims should not celebrate the festivals of other religions like Onam. Some Muslim Indian politicians light traditional vilakku (oil lamps), while others have refused to light these lamps at Onam events declaring it to be a Hindu tradition and against the teachings of Islam. Muslim daily newspapers and other publications have condemned Muslim ministers who participate in Onam traditions. However some Muslims observe Onam anyway, considering its celebrations and rituals as a cultural practice.

According to Ritty A. Lukose, Onam is a Hindu festival, one that is culturally inclusive within the "secular lexicon" of Hinduism. In recent years, however, it has undertaken a political tone. In one case, students group affiliated with Hindu nationalism in Kerala objected when a Muslim played the role of Mahabali.They protested against the local organizer when alternate Hindus are available to play that role. According to Lukose, this incident shows how "the cultural figure of King Mahabali, understood as Hindu, tolerant and inclusive" into an "exclusively Hindu one".

Celebrations, rituals and practices 
Onam falls in the month of Chingam, which is the first month according to the Malayalam Calendar. The celebrations mark the Malayalam New Year, are spread over ten days, and conclude with Thiruvonam. The ten days are sequentially known as Atham, Chithira, Chodhi, Vishakam, Anizham, Thriketa, Moolam, Pooradam, Uthradam and Thiruvonam. The first and the last day are particularly important in Kerala and to Malayalee communities elsewhere.

The Atham day is marked with the start of festivities at Vamanamoorthy Thrikkakara temple (Kochi). This Vishnu temple is considered as the focal centre of Onam and the abode of Mahabali, with the raising of the festival flag. Parades are held, which are colourful and depict the elements of Kerala culture with floats and tableaux.

Other days have a diverse range of celebrations and activities ranging from boat races, cultural programs, sports competitions, dance events, martial arts, floral Rangoli – pookkalam, prayers, shopping, donating time or food for charity to spending time with family over feasts. Men and women wear traditional dress. The Kerala sari or Kasavu sari is particularly wore on this day.

Athachamayam

The Onam celebrations across the state starts off with a grand procession at Thrippunithura near Kochi called Atthachamayam, also referred to as Thripunithura Athachamayam. The parade features decorated elephants marching, drum beats and other music, folk art forms, floats and colorfully dressed people with masks. In Kerala's history, the Kochi king used to head a grand military procession in full ceremonial robes from his palace to the Thrikkakara temple, meeting and greeting his people. In contemporary times, this a state-supported event.

The parade floats traditionally feature scenes from epics such as the Mahabharata and the Ramayana. Additionally, some floats include themes from the Bible as well as current themes thereby highlighting unity and harmony.

The procession path historically has been from Tripunithura to the Vamanamoorthy Temple in Thrikkakara, Ernakulam district. The temple is dedicated to Vishnu in his Vamana (dwarf) avatar. After arrival at the temple, the marchers offer a prayer.

Pookkalam (Flower Rangoli)

The floral Rangoli, known as Onapookkalam, Athapookkalam or just Pookkalam, is made out of the gathered blossoms with several varieties of flowers of differing tints pinched up into little pieces to design and decorate patterns on the floor, particularly at entrances and temple premises like a flower mat. Lamps are arranged in the middle or edges. It is a work of religious art, typically the team initiative of girls and women, who accomplish it with a delicate touch and a personal artistic sense of tone and blending. When completed, a miniature pandal (umbrella) hung with little festoons is erected over it. The pookkalam is similar to Rangoli which is made of powders of various colors and is popular in North India.

The traditional ritual of laying pookkalam (floral Rangoli) starts on Atham day. The pookkalam on this day is called Athapoo, and it is relatively small in size. The size of the pookkalam grows in size progressively with each day of the Onam festival. Only yellow flowers will be used on Atham with only one circular layer made and the design is kept simple. Statues or figurines of Mahabali and Vamana are also installed at the entrance of each house on this day.

Traditionally, Atthapookalams included flowers endemic to Kerala and the Dashapushpam (10-flowers), but nowadays all varieties of flowers are used. Earthen mounds, which look somewhat like square pyramids, representing Mahabali and Vamana are placed in the dung-plastered courtyards in front of the house along with the Pookalam, and beautifully decorated with flowers. All over Kerala, Pookalam competitions are a common sight on Onam day.

Music and dance

Traditional dance forms including Thiruvathira, Kummattikali, Pulikali, Thumbi Thullal, Onam Kali and others. Thiruvathira Kali is a women's dance performed in a circle around a lamp. Kummattikali is a colorful-mask dance. In Thrissur, festivities include a procession consisting of caparisoned elephants surrounded by Kummatikali dancers. The masked dancers go from house to house performing the colorful Kummattikali. Onam Kali is a form of dance where players arrange themselves in circles around a pole or tree or lamp, then dance and sing songs derived from the Ramayana and other epics.

Kathakali dance is also commonly performed during this time, with dancers enacting characters from the various Ancient Indian legends. A famous venue for this is at Valluvanad which is associated with the growth of Kathakali, and Cheruthuruthy, where Kerala Kalamandalam is located.

Pulikali: tiger dance

Pulikali, also known as Kaduvakali is a common sight during the Onam season. This dance showcases performers painted like tigers in bright yellow, red and black, who dance to the beats of instruments like Chenda and Thakil. This folk art is mainly performed in the cultural district of Thrissur and thousands pour into the city to be a part of this art.

Performances of the ritual worship dance, Theyyam, are given during the Onam season. In this, Mahabali is played by the Onathar. Its variations include characters such as Oneswaran and Onapottan.

At the Thrikkakara temple, every day of the festival showcases one or more of these activities including Kathakali, Thiruvathira, Chakyar Koothu, Ottam Thullal, Patakam, Onam songs, and percussion instrument shows. The Onasadya here is grand in scale, and is attended by over ten thousand people from all religions and faiths. Festivities include Puli Kali (masked leopard dance) and traditional dance forms like Kaikotti Kali which are performed in various functions. The official Government celebrations start on this day with heavy illuminations in Thiruvananthapuram, Kochi and Kozhikode along with fireworks.

Most cities in Kerala, such as the political, commercial and cultural capitals, Thiruvananthapuram, Kochi and Thrissur, are lit up with lights and fabulous displays of fireworks. Sumptuous Onam Sadya feasts are prepared. In Thrikkakara temple, a mega-feast is conducted, which is open to the public and is attended by more than twenty thousand people.

Vallamkali: boat race

The Vallamkali (the snake boat race) is another event that is synonymous with Onam. Well-known races include the  Aranmula Uthrattadhi Boat Race and the Nehru Trophy Boat Race. Numerous oarsmen row huge snake-shaped boats. Men and women come from far and near to watch and cheer the snake boat race through the water. This event is particularly featured on the Pampa River, considered sacred and Kerala equivalent of Ganges River.

As a tribute to the traditional snake boat race, a similar snake boat race is also held by the Malayali diaspora in Singapore annually during Onam at the Jurong Lake.

Onam Sadya

The Onam sadya (feast) is another indispensable part of Onam, and almost every Keralite either makes or attends one. The Onasadya reflects the spirit of the season and is traditionally made with seasonal vegetables such as yam, cucumber, ash gourd and so on. The feast is served on plantain leaves and consists of nine courses, but may include over two dozen dishes, including (but not limited to): Chips (especially Banana chips), Sharkaraveratti (Fried pieces of banana coated with jaggery), Pappadam, various vegetable and soups such as Injipuli (also called PuliInji), Thoran, Mezhukkupuratti, Kaalan, Olan, Avial, Sambhar, Dal served along with a small quantity of ghee, Erisheri, Molosyam, Rasam, Puliseri (also referred to as Velutha curry), Kichadi (not to be confused with Khichdi) and Pachadi (its sweet variant), Moru (buttermilk or curd mixed with water), Pickles both sweet and sour, and coconut chutney. The feast ends with a series of dessert called Payasam (a sweet dish made of milk, sugar, jaggery, and other traditional Indian savories) eaten either straight or mixed with ripe small plantain. The curries are served with rice, usually the 'Kerala Matta' parboiled rice preferred in Kerala.

In hotels and temples, the number of curries and dishes may go up to 30. The importance of the feast to Kerala's Onam celebration culture is captured in the famous Malayalam proverb "Kaanam Vittum Onam Unnanam" which means "One must have the Onam lunch even by selling one's property if need be." The Travancore-style Onasadya is renowned to be the most disciplined and tradition-bound.

The Kurichians tribe of Parambikkulam celebrate Onam as a festival for eating new grains. Just before Onam, they go for a community hunt and the games bagged during the hunt are distributed among participants and consumed in family feasts. The feasts are held on Uthradam and Thiruvonam. Their feast also include fish and meat.

Post Onam celebrations 
Normally, the largest chunk of Onam celebrations ends by Thiruvonam. However, the two days following Thiruvonam are also celebrated as Third and Fourth Onam. The third Onam, called Avvittom marks the preparations for King Mahabali's return ascension to heavens. The main ritual of the day is to take the Onathappan statue which was placed in the middle of every Pookkalam during the past 10 days and immerse it in nearby rivers or sea. The Pookkalam will be cleaned and removed after this ritual.

Other customs

People buy and wear new clothes for the occasion of Onam, called Onakkodi.

During the Onam, Keralite Hindus install an image of Thrikkakara Appan or Onatthappan (Vishnu in the form of Vamana) in their home just as Hindus install images or murtis of Lord Ganesha on the Ganesha Chaturthi festival elsewhere.

Many lamps are lit in Hindu temples of Kerala during this celebration. A palmyra tree is erected in front of temples and surrounded by a wooden balustrade and covered with dry palmyra leaves. It is lit with a torch and burned to ashes to signify that King Mahabali went to Patala as a sacrifice.

The swing is another integral part of Onam, especially in rural areas. Young men and women, decked in their best, sing Onappaatt, or Onam songs, and rock one another on swings slung from high branches.

Onam season is often associated with creativity as weavers and potters go for excess production to cater to increased demands for their products during the season, especially in the North Kerala regions of Kannur and Kasargod. Handloom fairs are an integral part of the spirit of Onam festivities these days.

In some parts of Kerala, people indulge in various games and dances during and post-Thiruvonam. These are known as Onakkalikal. These include competitions such as Ox races (Maramadimatsaram), Uriyady, food-eating competitions, Pookalam competitions etc.in a special month.

Kuravans of Travancore use Onam as a day for offering thanks to their ancestral spirits. On Uthradam day, they offer liquor, rice cakes, flattened and parched rice, incense, camphor, etc. to the spirits. The ritual ends with a request to the spirits to be satisfied with their offerings and assured that the next attempt would be better. Then an appeal is made to protect the believers and to ward off evil spirits from their area. This ritual is locally known as kalayam vaikkal. A similar offering like this is done during Makaram harvest, known as Uchara.

Outside India
Onam is also celebrated by the worldwide Malayali diaspora. Celebrations are notable in Switzerland, the United Arab Emirates, Singapore, United Kingdom, New Zealand, and France (notably Paris and Marseille).

See also
 Onathallu - Performed in Kerala during Onam.
 Onam Songs - A comprehensive list of Onam songs

References

External links 
 

Hindu festivals
Folk festivals in India
Festivals in Kerala
Harvest festivals in India
August observances
September observances

Religious festivals in India